Ceuthomadarus chthoniopa is a moth in the family Lecithoceridae. It was described by Edward Meyrick in 1936. It is found in Iran and Iraq.

The wingspan is about 15 mm. The forewings are grey, suffusedly irrorated (sprinkled) with blackish. The stigmata are obscure and blackish, the plical somewhat beyond the first discal, an additional dot below the second discal. The hindwings are dark grey.

References

Moths described in 1936
Ceuthomadarinae